An outdoor 1936–1937 statue of Francis P. Duffy by Charles Keck is installed at Duffy Square, part of Times Square, in the New York City borough of Manhattan. The statue, which was dedicated on May 2, 1937, and has the title Father Francis P. Duffy, earned Keck a Grand Lodge Medal for Distinguished Achievement from the Masonic order.

See also

 1937 in art

References

External links
 
 

1937 establishments in New York City
1937 sculptures
Monuments and memorials in Manhattan
Outdoor sculptures in Manhattan
Sculptures by Charles Keck
Sculptures of men in New York City
Statues in New York City
Times Square